Allium amplectens, the narrowleaf onion, is a species of onion plant. It is native to the West coast of the United States, in Oregon, Washington State and California, also British Columbia in Canada. It grows in woods and especially in clay and serpentine soils.

Description
These open to produce between 10 and 50 shiny white or pale pink flowers, each under a centimeter wide. The six stout stamens and the ovary are white or tinted pink or lavender.

Cultivars include 'Graceful'.

References

External links

Jepson Manual Treatment
USDA Plants Profile
UC Photos gallery

amplectens
Onions
Flora of California
Flora of British Columbia
Flora of Oregon
Flora of Washington (state)
Natural history of the California chaparral and woodlands
Plants described in 1857
Taxa named by John Torrey
Flora without expected TNC conservation status